Butylene carbonate usually refers to 1,2-Butylene carbonate, but it may also refer to:
cis-2,3-Butylene carbonate
trans-2,3-Butylene carbonate

See also
Propylene carbonate
Ethylene carbonate, or dioxolan-2-one